The 1952–53 National Football League was the 22nd staging of the National Football League (NFL), an annual Gaelic football tournament for the Gaelic Athletic Association county teams of Ireland.

Dublin defeated Cavan in the final, wearing St Vincents' white and blue shirts — not just to prevent a colour clash, but because fourteen of their team were Vincents' men (the exception being goalkeeper Tony O'Grady of the Air Corps club).

Format 
Teams are placed into Divisions I, II, III and IV. The top team in each division reach the semi-final.

Results

Division I

Division II

Division III

Division IV

Finals

References

National Football League
National Football League
National Football League (Ireland) seasons